Dr. Arvinder Singh Soin is the Chief Hepatobiliary and Liver Transplant Surgeon & Chairman of the Institute of Liver Transplantation and Regenerative Medicine, Medanta-The Medicity, India.  A surgeon and pioneer in the field of liver transplantation, acknowledged for his work in establishing liver transplantation in India. Dr. Soin also runs the Liver Transplant institute at the Sir H. N. Reliance Foundation Hospital, Mumbai. Dr Soin has performed more than 3500 living donor liver transplants in India, which is the highest in the country, and the second-highest in the world.

Early life and education
Arvinder Singh Soin was born in Birmingham, United Kingdom in the year 1963. He went on to study medicine and surgery from India and UK. An alumnus of the All India Institute of Medical Sciences, New Delhi, where he spent 11 years gaining his MBBS and MS degrees. After which he pursued further studies to gain specialist experience in Liver and Gastrointestinal Surgery, during which he worked on the research thesis of Portal Hypertensive Gastropathy. Further, he also obtained FRCS (Fellowship of the Royal Colleges of Surgeons) degrees from both Glasgow and Edinburgh in the UK.  

Dr Soin was one of the first few surgeons in the UK to qualify for and obtain an Intercollegiate FRCS in Transplant Surgery. He trained and worked at the University of Cambridge for 5 years and the University of Birmingham for a year for Liver and Biliary Surgery, Liver, Kidney, Small Bowel and Pancreas transplantation.

Professional Experience
From 2001 to 2010, he established a humongous liver transplant centre at Sir Gangaram Hospital. In June 2010, he moved with his entire team to Medanta-The Medicity, Gurgaon (Delhi-NCR), where he established a 150-bedded (including 36 Liver ICU beds) dedicated Liver Treatment facility, carrying out 250 liver transplants and hundreds of complex liver and biliary tract surgeries every year.

Research
Dr A S Soin is recognized for his pioneering research in the field of liver transplantation and establishing Liver Transplantation in India in 1998 when he performed the country’s first successful transplant. At Cambridge, he conducted successful research in transplantation, for which more than 110 of his original research papers and book contributions have been published in international and national journals & books.

Faculty & Speaker
 Dr Soin was a Surgical Tutor at the University of Cambridge and also a Faculty at the Royal College of Surgeons of England twice. 

 He was a visiting fellow at the Kyoto University Hospital in 1997 and Asan Medical Center, Seoul, in 2000. 

 He was a visiting faculty at the Ege University, Izmir, Turkey in 2004 and Istanbul in 2006 & 2007.

 He is a regular Faculty member and speaker, often the only one from India, at most of the world's fora in Liver Transplantation such as ILTS, AASLD, APDW, IHPBA, IASGO, APASL, Asian Living Donor Liver Transplant Group and Asia Pacific Organ Transplant Forum.

 Dr Soin also serves on the committees of all the important National and International Societies, as well as the National Advisory Board in Liver Transplantation.

Recognitions
 Awarded Padma Shri by the President of India in 2010 for pioneering the development in Liver Transplantation in India. 
 Awarded the RD Birla Outstanding Clinician of the Year Award for the year 2010 
 Awarded the Zee TV - Swasth Bharat Samman Award for pioneering Liver Transplantation, 2011
 Medical Statesman of the Year - E-MEDINEWS AWARDS, 2012
 MSOSA Award for Excellence, 2014

Breakthrough Cases
 First successful cadaveric liver transplant in India 
 First successful left lobe liver transplant in India 
 First successful reduced cadaveric liver transplant in a child 
 First bloodless liver transplant in India  
 First bloodless liver transplant in India 
 India's youngest ever recipient (11 months) to receive a successful liver transplant.
  78-yr-old man is oldest to undergo liver transplant 
 India's first successful re-transplant (on a patient a year and a half after the first) 
 India's first and world's youngest Domino liver transplant  
 India's smallest liver transplant recipient (6kg)  
 India's first (and the world's first reported) successful swap liver transplant  
 World's first chain of three simultaneous liver transplants (combined domino and swap) 
 India's first successful Intestinal Transplant

Publications
 Soin AS; Efficacy and safety of everolimus with reduced tacrolimus in living-donor liver transplant recipients: 12-month results of a randomized multicenter study Jun 2018
 Soin AS; An international multicenter study of protocols for liver transplantation during a pandemic: A case for quadripartite equipoise Oct 2020
 Soin AS; Identification of an Upper Limit of Tumor Burden for Downstaging in Candidates with Hepatocellular Cancer Waiting for Liver Transplantation: A West-East Collaborative Effort Feb 2020
 Soin AS; Evaluation of the Intention-to-Treat Benefit of Living Donation in Patients With Hepatocellular Carcinoma Awaiting a Liver Transplant Sept 2021
 Soin AS; Liver Transplant Outcomes in India Jan 2022
 Soin AS; Restructuring Living-Donor Liver Transplantation at a High-Volume Center During the COVID-19 Pandemic Aug 2021
 Soin AS; Extrahepatic Malignancies and Liver Transplantation: Current Status Aug 2021
 Soin AS; De Novo Malignancy After Living Donor Liver Transplantation: A Large Volume Experience Oct 2020
 Soin AS; Experience With LDLT in Patients With Hepatocellular Carcinoma and Portal Vein Tumor Thrombosis Postdownstaging Nov 2020
 Soin AS; Outcome of hepatitis C-related liver transplantation in direct-acting antiviral era Dec 2020
 Soin AS; Association Between Administration of IL-6 Antagonists and Mortality Among Patients Hospitalized for COVID-19: A Meta-analysis Aug 2021
 Soin AS; Acute-on-chronic liver failure: consensus recommendations of the Asian Pacific association for the study of the liver (APASL): an update
 July 2019
 Soin AS; Liver Transplantation for Hepatocellular Carcinoma. Working Group Report from the ILTS Transplant Oncology Consensus Conference
 Jun 2020
 Soin AS; Tocilizumab plus standard care versus standard care in patients in India with moderate to severe COVID-19-associated cytokine release syndrome (COVINTOC): an open-label, multicentre, randomised, controlled, phase 3 trial May 2021
 Soin AS, Amanjit Singh; Recanalized umbilical vein as a conduit for anterior sector venous outflow reconstruction in right lobe grafts. Surgery. 2007 Jun;141(6):830. Epub 2007 Apr 17.
 Varma V, Gupta S, Soin A, Nundy S. Does the presence of a lump or jaundice in a patient with gall bladder cancer mean the lesion is not respectable.  Dig Surg  2009; 26:306-311

References

 NDTV expert panel
 R D Birla Award Indian Express 17 April 2011
 Dr. Soin's profile at WhatClinic 
 Dr. Soin at MyDocAdvisor
 Dr. Soin receives R.D. Birla award 
 Miracle Worker
 Medanta Institute of Liver Transplantation and Regenerative Medicine
 Medanta Mediclinic brings world-class liver care to Jammu
 National Health Protection Scheme: Hope Or Hype? - Blog by Dr. Soin
 Medanta organises International Liver Symposium Liver Symposium Organised by Dr. Soin
World's Smallest baby gets Liver Transplant from Dr. Soin's Team

Indian surgeons
20th-century Indian medical doctors
Fellows of the Royal College of Surgeons
Living people
Recipients of the Padma Shri in medicine
1963 births
People from Gurgaon
Medical doctors from Haryana
20th-century surgeons